The discography of White Lies, a London-based indie rock band, consists of six studio albums, two extended plays and twelve singles.
Formerly known as Fear of Flying, the group formed in Ealing in west London in 2002, whilst founding members Charles Cave and Jack Lawrence-Brown were both still at school. Harry McVeigh joined the band in 2004. They began as a "weekend project", before later releasing two 7-inch vinyls, ""Routemaster/Round Three" and "Three's a Crowd/Forget-Me-Nots".

White Lies' first release was a short extended play, titled "Unfinished Business". The release contained only two tracks and was limited to only 500 copies. They made their television debut on Later... with Jools Holland in May 2008, where they played "Unfinished Business" and "Death", the latter of which was released as a single later that year and reached number 52 in the United Kingdom. The band's second single, "To Lose My Life" was released in January 2009, and was their first single to break the top forty of the UK Singles Chart, reaching number 34.  To Lose My Life..., the band's debut album, was released one week later. The album was a commercial success, debuting at number one on the UK Albums Chart. It was the first debut album by a British band to do so in 2009. The album also charted in Ireland and the Netherlands, reaching peaks of 22 and 31 respectively. A third single from the album, "Farewell to the Fairground", was released on 23 March 2009. The release marked the band's most successful single to date, reaching number 33 in the UK and spending 5 weeks on the chart. "Death" was re-released on 29 June 2009. A music video was created for "Death" (Crystal Castles Remix).

Albums

Studio albums

Extended plays

Singles

Promotional Singles

As featured artist

Music videos

Notes

References

Discographies of British artists
Rock music group discographies
Discography